Roi Et might refer to
the town Roi Et
Roi Et Province
Mueang Roi Et district
Roi Et Airport